Retroactive is the fourth album by Grand Puba. It was released on September 6, 2009.

Track listing

Samples
"This Joint Right Here" contains a sample of "Sky's the Limit" by Rhythm Heritage
"Go Hard" contains a sample of "He'll Never Love You Like I Do" by The Spinners
"Reality Check' contains a sample of "Mother's Theme (Mama)" by Willie Hutch

Charts

References

2009 albums
Babygrande Records albums
Grand Puba albums
Albums produced by Large Professor
Albums produced by Q-Tip (musician)